Samuel Luiz Muñiz, a 24-year-old nursing assistant, was beaten to death in A Coruña, Galicia, Spain, on 3 July 2021. According to several witnesses, including the victim's friends, the crime was motivated by homophobia, which led to country-wide demonstrations in his memory, and in defence of LGBT community. Following the initial investigation, the police disagreed that homophobia was a motive, as the suspects had not known the victim before the attack and claimed to be unaware of the victim's sexual orientation. As of 5 October, seven people have been arrested for his death, one of them was released until the trial.

Victim
Luiz was born in Brazil and moved to Spain at the age of one. His mother was Spanish, and the family lived in Culleredo and later Arteixo, both in the vicinity of A Coruña. From the ages of 18 to 20 he studied to be a nursing assistant and worked as one in a nursing home while studying a further course to be a dental prosthetist. He played the flute in an Evangelical Christian congregation and did not disclose his homosexuality to his father, who was also of that faith. In a television interview, Luiz's father said that he had only spoken once to his son about the possibility that he was gay, but the young man did not want to continue the conversation.

Crime

According to Luiz's female friend who witnessed the crime, they were on a night out and stepped outside to smoke. Luiz was in a video call with another friend and rotated his phone to show the surroundings to the friend. A male and a female were walking by and believed they were being filmed. According to the witness, the male then walked up to Luiz and said, "you will either stop filming, or I'll kill you, faggot"; to this Luiz replied "Faggot, why?" before being beaten.
Luiz's friend and other men managed to break up the fight. Luiz then asked his friend to find his lost mobile phone. While she was away, the attacker returned with 12 others and beat Luiz to death. The beating took place over 15 minutes and 250 metres.

According to the investigation, after the killing the suspects have re-united twice more that night to discuss the incident. Presumably, in the second re-union, after learning the victim died, they coordinated between themselves to destroy some evidences.

Investigation
Two witnesses said that the group that killed Luiz was composed of Latin American or mixed-race men, between 20 and 30 years old.

Two men who helped to interrupt the initial fight are reported to be Ibrahima Shakur and Magatte, illegal immigrants from Senegal, who work as hawkers. The government considers regularising their legal situation in Spain as a reward for their actions. According to some reports the police also considers one of these men as a victim of the aggression, as he also was attacked during his intervention, and thus put his own life into danger.

Thirteen people were interviewed over the fatal beating. On 6 July, the police said that while they could not disregard any hypothetical motive, the initial evidence did not point to homophobia. According to investigators, the group of strangers would not have known that Luiz was gay. By the night of that same day, three people – two male and one female – were officially in custody. On 8 July the police confirmed an arrest of a fourth attacker, who allegedly also stole the victim's mobile phone after the attack. None of the arrested subjects has previous criminal records.

On 9 July, two more suspects were arrested, both underage, one of them having past criminal records. Three of four suspects arrested previously are ordered to stay in prison during pre-trial, without a release on bail option, while the other one (the woman) was released for the pre-trial period.

On 29 September, after about three months of investigation, a seventh suspect was arrested.

Suspects 
Authorities do not disclose the suspects' identities officially, beyond stating that all have Spanish nationality and are residents of A Coruña. The following information is known according to media sources. Overall, all suspects are deemed to have a known track record of previous street violence but managed to stay mostly under the police radar prior to the killing of Luiz.

 Diego (25 years old, male). The primary suspect, who started the aggression. Worked as a waiter, and occasionally as an unskilled worker in the port. Shortly before the killing, he had been kicked out of a pub due to aggressive behavior and argument with his girlfriend Katy.
 Katy (23 years old, female). The girlfriend of Diego. Studied to become a hairdresser, but quit. A known brawler and haughty person, who was a part of many previous conflicts, according to sources.
 Kaio (19 years old, male). One of the most violent among arrested suspects, who started the aggression alongside Diego. A Spanish-born male from a Brazilian upper-middle class family, who lived in Brazil for some periods of his life. He lived in A Coruña for the last two years, and worked as a waiter. Allegedly he was often a participant in street fights, and allegedly he was involved into another street fight the next day after killing Luiz. According to sources, unlike other arrested suspects he demonstrated a haughty and even defiant attitude the first days under arrest.
 Álvaro F. (20 years old, male), aka Yumba (or "El Llumba"). Reported to be a 3rd generation offspring of a rich coruñese family, drug addict from a young age, and an overall difficult child. He worked in the port, and according to media sources a close friend to the circles of the far-left football hooligan crew , although not a member of the crew. In their Twitter account, Riazor Blues denied any links with the suspect and condemned the crime.
 "M." (16 years old, male). Spanish, born in Madrid, and moved to A Coruña shortly before the COVID pandemic. Often a participant in street conflicts.
 "D. R." (17 years old, male). A person without an occupation (neither studied nor worked as of recently).
 Alejandro M. (male).

Reaction

Luiz's death was met by demonstrations in his memory in cities across Spain. In Madrid, police employed baton charges to break up demonstrations in the city centre; these actions were condemned by politicians including Mónica García and Pablo Echenique.

The President of Galicia, Alberto Núñez Feijóo, condemned the crime but said that he would not link it to homophobia until that had been established. The leader of the opposition, Ana Pontón, criticised this declaration. Luiz's father called for people not to politicise the crime.

Juan Carlos Monedero, a former leading member of Podemos, wrote on Twitter, "Let's see if anyone can explain to me what God were Vox and their supporters are praying to when they murder someone because of their hatred of homosexuals. Think about it @AlmeidaPP_ (José Luis Martínez-Almeida, mayor of Madrid), if you had put up the LGBTI flag on the city hall, the murder of Samuel would have been a bit more difficult." Vox announced that they would sue him for defamation, and Almeida condemned the insinuation against himself. Vox also announced plans to sue the political pundit Martu Garrote for having written "You spend all your life raising a son, ensuring his dream and, when you are happy because he is a nursing assistant, because he is a good person, because the worst has already happened, a pack of hyenas come and kill him because he doesn't live and love according to dogma. That is Vox, that is the far right".

The killing and the subsequent protests made international headlines in Europe and America and many international artists such as Sam Smith, Beyoncé, Ricky Martin and Lena Headey shared the news on their social media.

Notes

References

July 2021 crimes in Europe
Deaths by beating in Europe
2020s in Galicia (Spain)
History of A Coruña
Violence against LGBT people in Europe
2021 in Spain
Violence against gay men
LGBT history in Spain
2021 murders in Spain